Aniceto Marinas García (born 17 April 1866 in Segovia – died 23 September 1953 in Madrid) was a Spanish sculptor.

He became Director of the Real Academia de Bellas Artes de San Fernando in 1950, in replacement of the Count of Romanones.

Works 

 Monumento a los héroes del dos de Mayo, Segovia.
 Hermanitos de leche, Segovia.
 Velázquez, Paseo del Prado, Madrid.
 Al pueblo del dos de mayo de 1808, Madrid.
 Eloy Gonzalo, Madrid.
 Monument to the Constitution of 1812, Cádiz

References
Citations

Bibliography
 

1866 births
1953 deaths
Spanish sculptors
Spanish male sculptors
People from Segovia